A furiant is a rapid and fiery Bohemian dance in alternating 2/4 and 3/4 time, with frequently shifting accents; or, in "art music", in 3/4 time "with strong accents forming pairs of beats".
 
The stylised form of the dance was often used by Czech composers such as Antonín Dvořák in the eighth dance from his Slavonic Dances; in his 6th Symphony; in his Terzetto for Two Violins and Viola, third movement; and by Bedřich Smetana in The Bartered Bride and in his second volume for piano of Czech Dances (České tance 2), published in 1879 (Op. 21). It was also used by Brahms in the middle section of the second movement of his Sextet No. 2 in G Major. 

The use of the furiant by central European composers closely parallels their use of the dumka, a dance which often precedes the furiant.

Notes

References 
Vrkočová, Ludmila: Slovníček základních hudebních pojmů. 2005. 

19th century in music
Dance forms in classical music
European folk dances